Ram Krishna Tamrakar is a Nepalese politician. He was elected to the Pratinidhi Sabha in the 1999 election on behalf of the Nepali Congress. After the election he was first Minister of Industry, Commerce and Supplies and then Minister of Health.

Tamrakar is the Treasurer of the Nepali Congress.

In 2005 he was arrested in connection with anti-royal protests.

References

External links
Speech given by Tamrakar in 1999

Government ministers of Nepal
Living people
Nepali Congress politicians from Lumbini Province
Year of birth missing (living people)
Nepal MPs 1999–2002
Nepal MPs 1991–1994